Mary Onahan Gallery (Onahan, known as Molly; July 22, 1866 – January 12, 1941) was an American writer, critic and editor. She primarily wrote articles for  newspapers and magazines. Gallary was also the mother of three rear admirals in the U.S. Navy.

Biography

Early life and education
Mary Josephine Onahan was born in Chicago, Illinois, July 22, 1866. She was the daughter of William J. Onahan, a Chicago civic leader, and Margaret (Duffy) Onahan. There were five older siblings, all of whom died in infancy.

Gallery was educated at the Sacred Heart Academy in Chicago, graduating at an early age. Her aunt was one of the most valued and accomplished members of the order. Her family then moved temporarily to St. Louis, Missouri, where she continued her education.  Gallery was also self-taught, reading many books from William Onahan's extensive library. At the World's Columbian Exposition held in Chicago in 1893, Gallery attended a congress of women's representatives.

Marriage
On September 5, 1898, Mary Gallary married Daniel Vincent Gallery, a Chicago lawyer, at the Cathedral of the Holy Name in Chicago.  According to the New York Times, the marriage was an elopement. Her parents had disapproved of Mary dating Daniel, so the couple kept their plans secret.  When a reporter contacted William Onahan for comment, he called the story preposterous and a hoax.  Onahan then discovered a letter from Mary that revealed their plans.

Mary and Daniel Gallary had six children:

 U.S. Navy Rear Admiral Daniel V. Gallery, Jr.
 John Ireland Gallary
 Rear Admiral William Onahan Gallary 
 Mary Margaret Gallary
 Navy Rear Admiral Phillip Daly Gallary
 Martha Nancy Gallary

Career
Mary Gallery was a contributor to the Chicago daily papers, with many of her articles republished by the dailies in New York City. She believed that one of the important duties of American Catholics was to see that the church was done justice to in the columns of the daily press. Gallary also edited many Catholic newspapers and wrote numerous magazine articles. These articles covered literary, musical and philanthropic topics.  Gallary took her greatest interest in human nature stories about the practical betterment of the world, for, as one writer said of her:— "'Molly' Onahan would take more pleasure in the approving whoop of a lot of 'newsies' than in prim congratulations from all the prelates of a general council."

Gallery also wrote verse, but did not publicize it. Her papers at the Representative Women's and the Catholic Congress were among the best read. Of her style, Author Walter Lecky said:Although the youngest of Chicago's literary coterie, she is a writer of marked ability. There is a graceful mingling of strength and delicacy in her writings. If she will have patience, learn to use the pruning hook, her future is assured. The product of Ireland in America, a Celt in artistic environment—the only environment natural to a Celt—she points to what the Celt must be before another century lapses.

Death

Mary Gallery died in Milwaukee, Wisconsin on January 12, 1941. She was buried at Calvary Cemetery in Evanston, Illinois.

Selected works

By Mary Josephine Onahan
 "John Mitchel's Daughter", Catholic World, 1886
 "Chicago's White City by the Sea", The Irish Monthly, 1893
 Catholic Women's Part in Philanthropy, 1893
 "An Incident in Old Bologna, The Irish Monthly, 1895
 "Pierre Loti", Catholic World, 1895

By Mary Onahan Gallery
 Life of William J. Onahan : stories of men who made Chicago, 1929

References

Attribution

Bibliography

External links
 

1866 births
1941 deaths
19th-century American writers
19th-century American women writers
20th-century American non-fiction writers
20th-century American women writers
Editors of Illinois newspapers
Writers from Chicago
American Roman Catholic religious writers
American women non-fiction writers
Women newspaper editors